Marisol Ortiz de Zárate (born 1960) is a Spanish writer specializing in children's literature.

Career
Marisol Ortiz de Zárate's first book was Los enigmas de Leonardo, a historical young adult novel. With its publication, she began to give talks at schools about reading and as a storyteller. She received her first award in the Antonia Cerrato Short Story and Poetry Contest organized by the Association of Friends of Santa Amalia (Badajoz), with a story entitled "Los curas llevan pantalones bajo la sotana". The novel La canción de Shao Li, which won a 2010 Latino Book Award, made her well-known as a writer specializing in children's literature. This adventure book, as well as the rest of her novels, are recommended reading in many  (IES). In 2014 she published her first novel for adults, Una historia Perdida, which won the Felipe Trigo Novel Award.

Ortiz is a founding member of Krelia.a, the Association of Literary Creators of Álava, in Vitoria-Gasteiz, where she lives. She divides her time between writing and teaching at the City Council's creative writing workshops.

Works

Novels
 Los enigmas de Leonardo, Bruño, 2002, 
 La cruz bajo la lengua, Arte-Activo, 2007, 
 La canción de Shao Li, Bambú, 2009, 
 Cantan los gallos, Bambú, 2011, 
 Una historia perdida, Algaida, 2014, 
 Rebelión en Verne, Bambú, 2015, 
 Las lágrimas de la matrioska, Bambú, 2015, illustrations by Marina Suárez Ortiz de Zárate
 La fabuladora, Bambú, 2018,

Short stories
 "Los curas llevan pantalones bajo la sotana" (published in Papeles de Zabalanda, 2009)
 "Un día cualquiera"
 "Cuesta arriba" (published in El amor, los espejos, el tiempo, el camino, A-A Ediciones, 2012)
 "Refugio de piedra"
 "Descubriendo Berlín" (published in El Correo, section Territorios)
 "La noche más larga" (published in El Correo, section Territorios)
 "El confidente precioso" (published in El Correo, section Territorios)
 "El niño pez" (published in El Correo, section Territorios)
 "Por las montañas heladas" (published in Inquietos Vascones, Desnivel, 2013)
 "Campo fronterizo" (published in Un refugio, treinta escritores ante un campamento de refugiados de guerra, Fundación de Estudios Jurídicos y Sociales, 2014)
 "Pasaje a la vida" (published in Un país Extranjero, Agapein, 2016)
 "Calzada de colores" (published in El Correo)

Awards
 Antonia Cerrato Award, 2006
 Víctor Chamorro Award, 2006
 Encuentro de dos Mundos Award, 2009, Ferney-Voltaire (France)
 Latino Book Award for best young adult fiction, 2010, New York, for La canción de Shao Li
 Finalist at the Hache Awards, Cartagena, for La canción de Shao Li, 2010
 32nd Felipe Trigo Literary Award in the Novel category for Una historia perdida, 2012
 Finalist for the 2012 Euskadi Award for children's narrative for Cantan los gallos
 María Giralt Award, 2014

References

External links
 
 Krelia.a

1960 births
21st-century Spanish women writers
Living people
People from Vitoria-Gasteiz
Spanish women novelists
Spanish women short story writers
Spanish short story writers
Women writers of young adult literature
Spanish writers of young adult literature